The Parlar Foundation was created in 1981 in Ankara, Turkey to promote science and technology and its industrial applications. It was named after the late Professor Mustafa N. Parlar, a Dean of Engineering at the Middle East Technical University. The Parlar Foundation presents several annual awards, including a Service to Science and Honour Award, a Science Award, and a Service Award.
Recipients of the Science Award include the distinguished Turkish philosopher Ioanna Kucuradi, the noted international scientists Cahit Arf, Feza Gursey Erol Gelenbe, Celâl Şengör, and the noted historian Halil Inalcik.

Links 

 http://www.parlar.org.tr

Science and technology awards
Awards established in 1981